Mark Emery Roman (born on March 16, 1977) is a former American football player safety who played in the National Football League (NFL) for the Cincinnati Bengals, Green Bay Packers, and San Francisco 49ers. He played college football at Louisiana State University.

Professional career

The Cincinnati Bengals selected Roman in the second round (34th overall) of the 2000 NFL Draft. Roman was the first safety drafted and fourth defensive back drafted in 2000. He also became the highest safety drafted from LSU since Tommy Casanova in 1972, but was later surpassed by LaRon Landry (sixth overall) in 2007 and Jamal Adams (sixth overall) in 2017.

References

1977 births
Living people
People from New Iberia, Louisiana
American football safeties
Cincinnati Bengals players
Green Bay Packers players
LSU Tigers football players
San Francisco 49ers players